Zenor is a surname. Notable people with the surname include:

Richard Zenor, medium who channeled the master teacher Agasha and founded the Agasha Temple of Wisdom.
Susanne Zenor (born 1947), American actress
William T. Zenor (1846–1916), United States Representative for Indiana